Belgica is a 2016 Belgian drama film directed by Felix Van Groeningen, written by Van Groeningen and . The movie is based upon a true story and revolves around a group of friends trying to run a bar where rock bands come to play. Belgica has since then become a cult film.

The film premiered at the Sundance Film Festival on January 21, 2016. It was released in Belgium and France on March 2, 2016, by Kinepolis Film Distribution and Pyramide Distribution.

Plot
Jo runs “Belgica”, an artistic pub in Ghent where all kind of people are welcome.  His brother Frank is shareholder in a second-handed car company.

The brothers are estranged due to their abusive, alcoholic father. One evening, Frank visits the pub of his brother. As he likes it he decides to come over more. When the adjacent warehouse is on sale Frank convinces Jo to buy it, to convert it into a dance hall and to restyle “Belgica”. Frank and Jo decides to become partners with each 50% of the shares.  To get the money, Frank sells the shares of his own company, but due to a cashflow issue his business partner can only pay a small part of it, but they have an oral agreement the remaining sum will follow in a few months.

The new dance room is inspected. The inspector gives a permission for a maximum total of 80 persons as there is only one legal emergency exit which ends up in a narrow alley. Frank bribes the inspector by giving him a huge amount of dark money.

The restyled "Belgica" is a success and many employees, mostly friends, are hired. One evening, a recurring riot starts a fight. He is overwhelmed by Frank and his "security staff" and locked into a room until the arrival of the police. The police tells them it is illegal to confine a person and has a proposal: if Jo and Frank do not charge the riot, the police will turn a blind eye about what's going on in "Belgica" referring to the black money, supposed drug use... It is a fact drugs are used, even by the owners and staff.

Some time later, the riot turns up again and Frank beats him up. Manu, who is responsible for security, does not approve Franks action, and resigns. Frank convinces Jo to hire a professional security team instead to rely on their friends. His ulterior motive is to deny access to  riots, people from lower class, ... resulting in the rejection of many regular customers.

The profits are lower than expected thus drinks become more expensive. Frank makes more and more one-sided decisions. He opens a VIP bar on the second floor as this will raise revenues but he neglects the additional costs.

As “Belgica” is not anymore what Jo wanted to reach, he decides to quit and wants to sell his shares to Frank based upon the value according to the bookkeeping system. Frank is frustrated as he invested much black money in the business which is now neglected. Anyway, Frank agrees and calls his former partner only to find out he absconded meaning Frank will never get the remaining money.

Ultimately, Frank quits. Jo continues with the pub with two investors. Frank and his wife build a house with the money they got by selling his shares. Jo returns to his pub but it has lost its name, glamour and customers.

Cast
 Stef Aerts as Jo
 Tom Vermeir as Frank
 Héléne Devos as Marieke
 Charlotte Vandermeersch as Isabelle
 Boris Van Severen as Tim Coppens
 Sara De Bosschere as Nikki
 Dominique Van Malder as Manu Dewaey
 Sam Louwyck as Rodrigo
 Stefaan De Winter as Ferre
 Silvanus Saow as Rudy Rasta

History 
The movie is based upon true events. Jo Van Groeningen, the father of director Felix Van Groeningen, started a pub in Ghent in 1988 with the name "Charlatan". Many of the events in the film actually did happen: many of the employees were friends, the adjacent house was turned over in a dance room, professional security staff was hired (in this case with the intention to prohibit access to drugs addicts),...  . Although "Belgica" seems to be bankrupt at the end of the movie, pub "Charlatan" still exists.

Production
The film was shot in Ghent between December 1, 2014 and January 10, 2015. The soundtrack consists of 15 pieces of music by Soulwax, a band formed by the Dewaele brothers from Ghent, composed specifically for the movie. Soulwax composed music of different styles for each of the sixteen fictional bands that performed at the club in the movie.

Release
The film had its world premiere at the Sundance Film Festival on January 21, 2016, where it opened the World Dramatic Competition. Shortly after, Netflix acquired global distribution rights to the film, excluding select territories. It was released in Belgium and France on March 2, 2016. It was released on April 15, 2016, by Netflix.

The soundtrack was released by PIAS Recordings on February 26, 2016.

Reception
Van Groeningen won the Best Director prize in the World Cinema Dramatic section at the 2016 Sundance Film Festival. The film received a Magritte Award for Best Flemish Film at the 7th Magritte Awards.

Many reviews of the film highlighted the film's soundtrack. Todd McCarthy of The Hollywood Reporter wrote "Van Groeningen catches the ebb and flow of [the brothers' success] in a very fluid way, synching up dramatic and mood shifts with apt musical choices that make the film a sensual pleasure." Lanre Bakare of The Guardian praised the film's accuracy in "replicating hedonism going off the rails" instead of being "a morality tale about excess and its certain fatal consequences", also mentioning the "great Soulwax soundtrack" in their four-star review of the film.

References

External links
 
 
 

2016 films
2016 drama films
Belgian drama films
Belgian rock music films
2010s Dutch-language films
Films set in Belgium
Films shot in Belgium
Films shot in Ghent
Ghent in fiction
Films directed by Felix van Groeningen
Magritte Award winners